Limmareds glasbruk, near Limmared, is Sweden's oldest still running glassworks. It was founded in 1740. Limmareds glasbruk is the manufacturer of the Absolut Vodka bottle.

References

Glassmaking companies of Sweden
Companies established in 1740
Companies based in Västra Götaland County
Swedish brands